Favre is a surname.

Favre may also refer to:

 Favre Bjerg, a mountain in Greenland
 Favre Lake, Nevada
 A. Favre & Fils, watch manufacturer

See also
 Favre–Racouchot syndrome
 Fabre (disambiguation)